Henry Bowers may refer to:

Henry F. Bowers (1837–1911), American politician
Henry Robertson Bowers (1883–1912), British explorer
Henry Bowers, fictional character in It by Stephen King